Rhodopeziza is a genus of fungi within the Pezizaceae family. This is a monotypic genus, containing the single species Rhodopeziza tuberculata.

References

External links
Index Fungorum

Pezizaceae
Monotypic Ascomycota genera